Girdwood Depot is a passenger railroad station in Girdwood, south of Anchorage, Alaska. The station offers service for the Alaska Railroad's Coastal Classic and Glacier Discovery routes.

References

Alaska Railroad stations
Buildings and structures in Anchorage, Alaska